The Salgado River is a river of Sergipe state in northeastern Brazil. It is a tributary of the Vaza-Barris River.

See also
List of rivers of Sergipe

References
Brazilian Ministry of Transport

Rivers of Sergipe